The Lewes pound is a local currency in use in the town of Lewes, East Sussex.  Inspired by the Totnes pound and BerkShare, the currency was introduced with the blessing of the town council in September 2008 by Transition Town Lewes as a community response to the challenges of climate change and peak oil.

History
Lewes first introduced its own currency in 1789, but this was discontinued in 1895 along with a number of other local currencies. Its reintroduction in September 2008 achieved national media coverage.

On 3 July 2009, it was announced that the scheme was to be extended and that new notes of £5, £10 and £21 denominations would be issued. The £21 note emphasises the fact that five pence of each Lewes pound bought goes to the local charity the Live Lewes Fund.

, notes in circulation are:
1 Pound, green, undated
1 Pound, green, 2009
1 Pound, green, 2017
5 Pounds, blue, 2009
5 Pounds, blue, 2013
5 Pounds, blue, 2017
10 Pounds, yellow, 2009
10 Pounds, blue, 2014
21 pounds, red, 2009

A special issue was printed for the 750th anniversary of the Battle of Lewes in mid-2014.

Value

The value of the Lewes Pound is fixed at £1 stg, and in January 2023 could be used in any of approximately 100 shops and businesses in Lewes, many more than envisaged when the currency was first introduced.  Occasionally local businesses give a discount for payment in Lewes Pounds, though this happens less in these difficult financial times. Some of the earliest notes were sold on eBay for substantially higher values, which led the Lewes Pound CIC to start selling collectors packs of LPs to help fund its operations. Comment from the Lewes Pound CIC - "Despite claims to the contrary in The Times, it is clear that a so-called tourist attraction does bring more visitors into Lewes, who do then spend money in local restaurants and shops."

Appearance

The front features a picture of the South Downs with an image of Lewes resident Thomas Paine and a quotation of his: "We have it in our power to build the world anew". On the back is a picture of Lewes Castle. The notes are printed on traditional banknote paper and have a number of security features including unique numbering, watermarks and heat marks.

Criticism
The Lewes pound and the Transition Towns movement have received criticism for a failure to address the needs of the wider Lewes population, especially lower socio-economic groups. Such local currency initiatives have been more widely criticised in light of limited success in stimulating new spending in local economies and as an unrealistic strategy to reduce carbon emissions.

See also

 Bristol pound
 Stroud pound
 Totnes pound
 BerkShares
 Toronto Dollar
 Brixton pound

References

External links
 Official web site
 details, pictures and bulletin board
 Community Currency Online Magazine

Local currencies of the United Kingdom
Lewes
Currencies of England